Oreophryne zimmeri is a species of frog in the family Microhylidae, although there is doubt whether it really is an Oreophryne. It is endemic to Sulawesi (Indonesia) and known from its type locality in the Mengkoka Mountains, southeastern Sulawesi, and from another record from South Sulawesi. The specific name zimmeri honours Carl Wilhelm Erich Zimmer, a German zoologist. Common name Zimmer's cross frog has been proposed for it.

Oreophryne zimmeri is only known from two specimens.

References

zimmeri
Endemic fauna of Indonesia
Amphibians of Sulawesi
Taxa named by Ernst Ahl
Amphibians described in 1933
Taxonomy articles created by Polbot